Christian Life Center Academy (CLCA) is a private, college preparatory Christian school serving primary, secondary and postgraduate students located in the Kingwood area of Houston. It was previously in another section of the city of Houston, near Humble.

CLCA serves approximately 150 students from Daycare – 12th Grade and is a self-supporting agency of the Christian Life Center Church.

History
In 1992, Christian Life Center Academy opened its doors to 25 students. Notable alumni include Ben McLemore of the Sacramento Kings, DeAndre Jordan of the L.A. Clippers, and Latavious Williams of Bilbao Basket. Christian Life Center is part of Christian Life Center church. In addition to the church ministry, Christian Life Center also has a coffee shop, book store, day care center and a Christian school with nearly 400 children in the Kingwood area.

Notable alumni

Junior Cadougan (professional basketball player)
DeAndre Jordan (NBA player) 
Michale Kyser (born 1991), basketball player for Hapoel Holon in the Israeli Basketball Premier League
Ben McLemore (NBA player)
Latavious Williams (NBA player)

References

External links
Christian Life Center Academy

Private K-12 schools in Houston
Christian schools in Houston
1992 establishments in Texas